The 2006–07 Slovenian Hockey League was the 16th season in Slovenia.

At the end of the regular season the playoffs, also known as the Slovenian Ice Hockey League, was held. Slavija had the best result in the regular season, but they could not convert this in the finals, where they lost to Olimpija.

Teams
 Alfa
 HDD Olimpija
 HK Olimpija
 Jesenice
 Maribor
 Mladi Jesenice
 Slavija
 Triglav Kranj

Standings after regular season

Play-offs

First part

Final
Olimpija defeated Slavija in a best of seven series.
Olimpija – Slavija 2–4 
Olimpija – Slavija 5–3 
Slavija – Olimpija 1–6 
Slavija – Olimpija 1–2
Olimpija – Slavija 4–3

1
Slovenia
Slovenian Ice Hockey League seasons